The westslope cutthroat trout (Oncorhynchus clarkii lewisi), also known as the black-spotted trout, common cutthroat trout and red-throated trout is a subspecies of the cutthroat trout (Oncorhynchus clarkii) and is a freshwater fish in the salmon family (family Salmonidae) of order Salmoniformes. The cutthroat is the Montana state fish. This subspecies is a species of concern in its Montana and British Columbia ranges and is considered threatened in its native range in Alberta.

Taxonomy
The scientific name of the westslope cutthroat trout is Oncorhynchus clarkii lewisi. The subspecies was first described in the journals of explorer William Clark from specimens obtained during the Lewis and Clark Expedition from the Missouri River near Great Falls, Montana.  Cutthroat trout were given the name Salmo clarki in honor of William Clark, who co-led the expedition of 1804–1806. One of Lewis and Clark's missions was to describe the flora and fauna encountered during the expedition.  The type specimen of S. clarki was described by naturalist John Richardson in 1836 from a tributary of the lower Columbia River, identified as the "Katpootl", which was perhaps the Lewis River as there was a Multnomah village of similar name at the confluence.  This type specimen was most likely the coastal cutthroat subspecies.  In 1853, naturalist George Suckley while working for the Pacific Railroad Survey led by Isaac Stevens collected specimens of westslope cutthroat trout by fly fishing below the Great Falls on the Missouri River.  In 1856, he described the trout as Salar lewisi to honor explorer Meriwether Lewis.  In David Starr Jordan and Barton Warren Evermann's A Check-list of the Fishes and Fishlike Vertebrates of North and Middle America (1896), the name Salmo mykiss lewisi was given to Yellowstone trout or cut-throat trout and included a reference to specimens collected from the Missouri River by George Suckley.  In 1898, Jordan and Evermann changed the name of cutthroat trout to Salmo clarki.  Salmo clarki lewisi persisted as the subspecies name for both the Yellowstone cutthroat and westslope cutthroat trout until 1971 when fisheries biologist Robert J. Behnke gave the name Salmo clarki bouvieri to the Yellowstone cutthroat with Salmo clarki lewisi reserved for the westslope cutthroat trout.

In 1989, morphological and genetic studies indicated trout of the Pacific basin were genetically closer to Pacific salmon (Oncorhynchus species) than to the Salmos–brown trout (S. trutta) or Atlantic salmon (S. salar) of the Atlantic basin.  Thus, in 1989, taxonomic authorities moved the rainbow, cutthroat and other Pacific basin trout into the genus Oncorhynchus.

Description

The fish has teeth under its tongue, on the roof of the mouth, and in the front of the mouth. Westslope cutthroat are common in both headwaters lake and stream environments. They feed mainly on insects and zooplankton. The average length of the fish is about 8- and rarely exceeds . The skin has small dark freckle-like spots clustered towards the tail, and is mostly orange-hued. They can be distinguished from rainbow trout by the red, pink, or orange marking beneath the jaw (hence the name "cutthroat").

Range
Westslope cutthroat trout are native in northern Idaho's and British Columbia's upper Columbia River system and northern tributaries of the Snake River, but not the Snake River's main stem to the south.  East of the Continental Divide in Alberta and Montana, westslope cutthroat trout are native to the upper Missouri, Milk and North Saskatchewan rivers, but not the Yellowstone River to the south. In Montana, the historic range extended east to the mouth of the Judith River and south into the Madison, Gallatin and Jefferson river systems.   Isolated populations of westslope cutthroat trout exist in upper tributaries of the John Day River in the Strawberry Mountains of Oregon and Columbia River tributaries along the eastern side of the Cascade range in Washington. Isolated populations exist in the Fraser River basin in British Columbia.  Existing populations of genetically pure westslope cutthroat trout exist in less than three percent of its historic range.

Life cycle
Westslope cutthroat trout reflect three life strategies—adfluvial, fluvial, or stream resident.
Adfluvial fish live in the large lakes in the upper Columbia River drainage and spawn in lake tributaries. Fluvial fish live in medium to large rivers but migrate to tributaries for spawning. Most adults return to the river or lake after spawning. Stream resident fish complete their entire life in tributaries. All three forms occur in most basins.

Conservation
Genetically pure westslope cutthroat trout have been extirpated throughout most of their historic range due to habitat loss and introduction of non-native species.  Remaining populations survive in isolated populations, mostly in headwater streams above natural downstream barriers.  The introduction of rainbow and brown trout into Missouri River tributaries eliminated the westslope cutthroat trout from most of its eastern range in Montana. Introductions of non-native kokanee salmon (Oncorhynchus nerka), lake trout (Salvelinus namaycush) and lake whitefish (Coregonus clupeaformis) into Flathead Lake and the Flathead River system caused drastic declines in westslope cutthroat trout populations. Existing populations are in imminent danger from land-use activities and hybridization with introduced rainbow trout (resulting in cutbows) and Yellowstone cutthroat trout. Even the strongest populations in Glacier National Park and the Flathead Basin of Montana are in serious decline. Reasons for the critical condition of the subspecies include habitat destruction from logging, road building, grazing, mining, urban development, agriculture and dams, introduction of non-native hatchery strains, competition and hybridization from introduced non-native fish species.

Notes

Further reading

External links
 
 Montana Fish, Wildlife & Parks :: Westslope Cutthroat Trout

Oncorhynchus
Cold water fish
Freshwater fish of North America
Fish of Canada
Fish of the Western United States
Freshwater fish of the United States
Fauna of the Northwestern United States
Fauna of the Rocky Mountains
Natural history of Montana
Symbols of Montana
Taxa named by George Suckley
Fish described in 1856